Shands may reference one of the following:

William A. Shands, a Florida politician for whom the following are named:
UF Health Shands Hospital, a medical center in Gainesville, Florida
UF Health Jacksonville, a medical center in Jacksonville, Florida, formerly referred to as Shands Jacksonville
Shands Bridge, which spans the St. Johns River south of Jacksonville, Florida
Shands, California, a former settlement